Paul Breslin is a geneticist and biologist.

He is most notable for his work in taste perception and oral irritation, in humans as well as in Drosophila melanogaster, the common fruit fly.

He is a member of the faculty at the Monell Chemical Senses Center and acts as director of the Science Apprenticeship Program.  He is a professor in the Department of Nutritional Sciences at Rutgers, the State University of New Jersey. Breslin and two colleaguesdiscovered that Oleocanthal, a compound found in extra-virgin olive oil kills a variety of human cancer cells without harming healthy cells.

References

Living people
Year of birth missing (living people)
Place of birth missing (living people)
Nationality missing
Rutgers University faculty
American geneticists
University of Pennsylvania alumni